Kunzum Pass (Tibetan: Kunzum La, elev. ), is a high mountain pass in the eastern Kunzum Range of the Himalayas. It connects Lahaul valley and Spiti valley. It is on the route from Gramphoo in Lahaul to Kaza the subdivisional headquarters of Spiti.

Transport

NH505 over the Kunzum Pass connects Kaza to Manali in southwest, and Kaurik, Sumdo, Pooh & Tabo in east. Kaza-Pooh-Tabo-Shimla route is open whole year, but the Manali-Kaza route is closed for 7 winter months every year during which Kunzum Pass (15,000 ft) is closed. NHAI is planning to construct a tunnel under the Kunzum Pass to provide all-weather connectivity between Manali and Spiti valley. The Kunzum Pass is normally open from June/July to October/November. The dates of opening and closing are dependent on the weather and road repair by the Border Roads Organisation.

NH505 from the Manali-Gramphoo side in the west climbs steeply through fifteen (15) sharp hairpin turns from Batal (el. ) on the Chandra River, testing the driving skills of even experienced drivers. On the Kaza side in east, the road from the small town of Losar (el. ) runs on the right bank of a tributary of the Spiti. It climbs through a dry, semi-desert landscape  up to the Kunzum Pass.

Tourism

Many drivers and travelers seek blessings of Kunzum Mata before continuing on the dangerous journey.  There is also a 15 km trek to Chandratal, the Moon Lake, from the Kunzum La.

Gallery

References

Mountain passes of Himachal Pradesh
Geography of Kullu district
Geography of Lahaul and Spiti district